Leonora Ejupi (born 7 February 2000) is a Kosovan footballer who plays as a forward for German club Arminia Bielefeld and has appeared for the Kosovo women's national team.

Career
Ejupi has been capped for the Kosovo national team, appearing for the team during the UEFA Women's Euro 2021 qualifying cycle.

See also
List of Kosovo women's international footballers

References

External links
 
 
 

2000 births
Living people
Kosovan women's footballers
Kosovo women's international footballers
Women's association football forwards